Edith Volkmann (1920–1997) was a German film and television actress.

Selected filmography
 Corinna Schmidt (1951)
 Stärker als die Nacht (1954)
 Go for It, Baby (1968)
 I Only Want You To Love Me (1976)
 Die Konsequenz (1977)

References

Bibliography
 Sloan, Jane. Reel Women: An International Directory of Contemporary Feature Films about Women. Scarecrow Press, 2007.

External links

1920 births
1997 deaths
German television actresses
German film actresses
Actors from Hanover